The name dusky indigobird can also refer to Vidua purpurascens.

The dusky indigobird, variable indigobird, or black widowfinch (Vidua funerea) is a species of bird in the family Viduidae. It is found in Angola, Burundi, Cameroon, Republic of the Congo, Democratic Republic of the Congo, Eswatini, Guinea-Bissau, Malawi, Mozambique, Nigeria, Sierra Leone, South Africa, Tanzania, Zambia, and Zimbabwe. Its natural habitat is moist savanna.

References

External links
 Dusky indigobird - Species text in The Atlas of Southern African Birds.

dusky indigobird
Birds of Sub-Saharan Africa
dusky indigobird
Taxonomy articles created by Polbot